Aage Fønss (12 December 1887, in Arhus – 30 September 1976) was a Danish opera singer and actor. He was the younger brother of actor Johannes Fønss and director/producer Olaf Fønss.

Selected filmography

Kapergasten – 1910
Elverhøj – 1910
Valdemar Sejr – 1910
Ansigttyven I – 1910
Ansigttyven II – 1910
Holger Danske – 1913
Gæstespillet – 1913
Chatollets hemmelighed – 1916
Der Pfad der Sünde – 1916
Das Haus der Leidenschaften – 1916
Grevindens ære – 1919
Frie fugle – 1922
Den sidste dans – 1924
Paa slaget 12 – 1924
Panserbasse – 1936
Mille, Marie og mig – 1937
Balletten danser – 1938
Komtessen på Stenholt – 1939
En pige med pep – 1940
En mand af betydning – 1941
Peter Andersen – 1941
Forellen – 1942
To som elsker hinanden – 1944
Besættelse – 1944
Oktoberroser – 1946
Kampen mod uretten – 1949
For frihed og ret – 1949
Café Paradis – 1950
Harry og kammertjeneren – 1961
Paradis retur – 1964

External links
 

1887 births
1976 deaths
Danish male film actors
20th-century Danish male opera singers
Danish male silent film actors
20th-century Danish male actors
Danish male stage actors
Singers from Aarhus